Stachyurus is the only genus in the flowering plant family Stachyuraceae, native to the Himalayas and eastern Asia. They are deciduous shrubs or small trees with pendent racemes of 4-petalled flowers which appear on the bare branches before the leaves. The plants have leaves with serrate margins.

Pendunculagin, casuarictin, strictinin, casuarinin and casuariin are ellagitannins found in species in this genus.

Stachyurus praecox from Japan, and the slightly later-flowering S. chinensis from China, are both cultivated as ornamental plants, valued for their exceptionally early flowering periods.

Species list 
 Stachyurus chinensis
 Stachyurus coaetaneus 
 Stachyurus cordatulus
 Stachyurus himalaicus
 Stachyurus obovatus
 Stachyurus praecox
 Stachyurus retusus
 Stachyurus salicifolius
 Stachyurus yunnanensis

References

External links
Stachyuraceae in Stevens, P. F. (2001 onwards).

Stachyuraceae
Rosid genera